Chi-Huey Wong is a Taiwanese-American biochemist. He is currently the Scripps Family Chair Professor at the Scripps Research Institute, California in the Department of Chemistry. He is a member of the United States National Academy of Sciences, won the Wolf Prize in Chemistry and the RSC Robert Robinson Award. and has published more than 700 papers and holds more than 100 patents.

Education
Wong  received his BS and MS in Biochemical Sciences from National Taiwan University in Taipei, followed by his PhD in chemistry in 1982 at the Massachusetts Institute of Technology under the direction of Professor George M. Whitesides to study the use of enzymes as catalysts in organic synthesis.

Research and career
Wong continued his postdoctoral research work with George M. Whitesides at Harvard University from 1982 to 1983, then began his independent career at Texas A&M University in the Chemistry Department. During his tenure at Texas A&M University, he went through the ranks including assistant professor, associate professor, and professor of chemistry.

Wong was appointed as the Ernest W. Hahn Chair and Professor of Chemistry at the Scripps Research Institute and while he was a faculty member at Scripps, he also served as head of the Frontier Research Program on Glycotechnology at Riken in Japan and Director of the Genomics Research Center at Academia Sinica, and was later appointed by the President of the Republic of China (Taiwan) as the President of Academia Sinica. Now, he is  serving at the Scripps Research Institute as Scripps Family Chair Professor of Chemistry.

Wong is best known for his original contributions to glycoscience, especially his development of chemo-enzymatic methods for the practical synthesis of oligosaccharides and glycoproteins and the hierarchical and programmable one-pot synthesis method for the rapid preparation of a large number of oligosaccharides. The original synthetic methods developed by Wong along with his work on the development of glycan microarrays for the high-throughput analysis of protein-carbohydrate interaction and the design of glycosylation probes have enabled not only the fundamental study of glycosylation in biology but also the clinical development of carbohydrate-based medicines, including vaccines and homogeneous antibodies for the treatment of cancers and infectious diseases.

In 2016, there was a media report, speculating that he was possibly involved in an insider trading scandal related to a biotech company OBI Pharma, Inc. headquartered in Taiwan, because his adult daughter had held shares in OBI Pharma. When the allegations surfaced in March 2016, Wong was in the United States. He was quite disappointed by the false report and attempted to resign his position as president of the Academia Sinica twice. Both requests were rejected by the president of Taiwan, Ma Ying-jeou. After further consideration, Ma chose to approve Wong's resignation on 10 May. In February 2018, the Shilin District Prosecutors Office announced that charges of insider trading against Wong had been dropped, though an investigation into a possible failure in disclosing his assets during tech transfer of his invention had not yet concluded by the Control Yuan. In April 2022, the Control Yuan publicly announced that Wong did not violate any rule.

Awards and honors
1985 - Searle Scholar Award
1986 - Presidential Young Investigator Award in Chemistry
1994 - IUPAC International Carbohydrate Award
1998 - Harrison Howe Award, American Chemical Society
1999 - International Enzyme Engineering Award
1999 - Claude S. Hudson Award, American Chemical Society
2000 - United States Presidential Green Chemistry Award
2005 - American Chemical Society Award for Creative Work in Synthetic Organic Chemistry
2008 - F.A. Cotton Medal for Excellence in Chemical Research
2012 - Arthur C. Cope Award by the American Chemical Society. 
2014 - Wolf Prize in Chemistry
2015 - Robert Robinson Award, Royal Society of Chemistry
2021 - Welch Award in Chemistry
2022 - Chemical Pioneer Award of the American Institute of Chemists

Memberships
Wong was elected as a member of the Academia Sinica in 1994, the American Academy of Arts and Science in 1996, the United States National Academy of Sciences in 2002, the World Academy of Sciences in 2007, the United States National Academy of Inventors in 2014, and also an Associate Member of the European Molecular Biology Organization in 2010.

Bibliography
 Enzymes in Synthetic Organic Chemistry. Pergamon Press. 1994. 
 Carbohydrate Based Drug Discovery. Wiley Online Library. 2003. 
 Current Status and New Challenges in Glycoscience. Springer.

Patents
Wong obtained many patents for his inventions. His representative patents include Globo-H and related anti-cancer vaccines with novel glycolipid adjuvants (US9,603,913B2), Glycan arrays on PTFE-like aluminum coated glass slides and related methods (US8,680,020), Methods and compositions for immunization against virus (US8.741,311), Large scale enzymatic synthesis of oligosaccharides (US9,340,812), Methods for modifying human antibodies by glycan engineering (US10, 087,236), Compositions and methods relating to universal glycoforms for enhanced antibody efficacy (US10,023892), Crystal structure of bifunctional transglycosylase PBP1b from E. Coli and inhibitors thereof (US9890111B2), Quantitative analysis of carbohydrate-protein interactions using glycan microarrays: determination of surface and solution dissociation constants (US-8906832-B2), Antibiotic compositions and related screening methods (US8916540B2), Hirsutella Sinensis mycelia compositions and methods for treating sepsis and related inflammatory responses (US8486914B2), and Tailored glycoproteomic methods for the sequencing, mapping and identification of cellular glycoproteins (US7943330B2).

References

External links

 Chi-Huey Wong's research
Chi-Huey Wong – Semantic Scholar
Chi-Huey Wong – Google Scholar

1948 births
Living people
American biochemists
Massachusetts Institute of Technology School of Science alumni
Members of Academia Sinica
Members of the United States National Academy of Sciences
National Taiwan University alumni
People from Chiayi County
Scripps Research faculty
Taiwanese biochemists
Taiwanese emigrants to the United States
Texas A&M University faculty
Winners of the Nikkei Asia Prize